This is a list of former schools in the Roman Catholic Archdiocese of Milwaukee.

Colleges and universities 
 Dominican College of Racine, Racine 
 Holy Redeemer College, Waterford
 Mt. St. Paul College, Waukesha

High schools 
 Divine Savior High School, Milwaukee
 Don Bosco High School, Milwaukee 
 Francis Jordan High School, Milwaukee
 Holy Angels Academy, Milwaukee
 Madonna High School, Milwaukee
 Mercy High School, Milwaukee 
 Notre Dame High School, Milwaukee 
 Pio Nono High School, St. Francis 
 Sacred Heart High School, Milwaukee 
 St. Benedict the Moor High School, Milwaukee
St. Benedict the Moor High School was established in 1935 by Fr. Philip Steffes, OFM Cap, the pastor of St. Benedict the Moor Parish, a mostly African American community. It served both boarding and day high school students, many of whom came from St. Benedict the Moor Elementary School, the other parish school. Demographic changes and the construction of an expressway during the 1960s caused the parish membership and its schools' enrollment to severely decline. St. Benedict the Moor High School closed in 1964.
 St. Bonaventure High School, Sturtevant
 St. Francis de Sales High School, St. Francis 
 St. John Cathedral High School, Milwaukee
 St. John School for the Deaf, St. Francis
 St. Mary's Academy, St. Francis

Middle schools 
San Juan Diego Middle School, Racine

Elementary schools 
 St. Adalbert School, South Milwaukee
 St. Agnes Elementary School, Milwaukee
 St. Albert School, Milwaukee
 All Saints School, Milwaukee (merger of St. Casimir and St. Mary Czestocowa Schools)
 Alverno Elementary School, Milwaukee
 St. Anne School, Milwaukee
 St. Barbara's Elementary School, Milwaukee
 St. Benedict the Moore Elementary School, MilwaukeeSt. Benedict the Moor Elementary School was established in 1912 by Fr. Stephen Eckert, OFM Cap, the pastor of St. Benedict the Moor Parish, a mostly African American community. It served both boarding and day high school students. By 1935, there were 141 boarders and 130 day students (99% of whom were not Catholic), and a faculty of 22 Racine Dominican Sisters. The boarding school program was ended in 1954 at the request of the nuns, who could no longer service it. Demographic changes and the construction of an expressway during the 1960s caused the parish membership and its schools' enrollment to severely decline. St. Benedict the Moor Elementary School closed in 1967 after losing half its property to the expressway.
 St. Boniface School, Milwaukee
 St. Casimir School, MilwaukeeSt. Casimir School was established by Fr. Giles Tarasiewicz, the first pastor of the newly created Polish St. Casimir Parish. He and other parishioners set out to address their largest concern: the lack of a parochial school to educate the parish's many youth. The building was designed by architect Henry Messmer and was constructed from 1893-1894. The building is three stories tall, built of cream brick in the Victorian Romanesque Revival style with a hip roof and asphalt shingles.  It opened for classes in 1894, and also housed the School Sisters of Notre Dame, who taught at the school, as well as holding Sunday Masses in its gymnasium. The school population continued to increase in size along with the parish, so in 1910 two-story cream brick addition was added to the back of the building, designed by Herman J. Esser. Starting in the 1950s, the parish and school began seeing a decline in population. St. Casimir School was closed in the 1970s due to declining enrollment and a lack of teachers.
 St. Casimir School, Racine
 Corpus Christi Catholic School, Milwaukee 
 St. Elizabeth Elementary School, Milwaukee 
 St. Francis of Assisi School, Milwaukee 
 St. Frederick Elementary School, Cudahy 
 St. Gall's School, Milwaukee 
 St. Hedwig School, MilwaukeeSt. Hedwig School was built in 1889 and was staffed by the School Sisters of Notre Dame until its closure.
 Holy Angels Elementary School, Milwaukee 
 Holy Assumption School, West Allis 
 Holy Cross School, Belgium 
 Holy Family School, Cudahy 
 Holy Name School, Racine
 Holy Redeemer School, Milwaukee 
 Holy Rosary School, Milwaukee
 Holy Spirit Grade School, Milwaukee 
 Holy Trinity School, Milwaukee
 St. John's Catholic Grade School, South Milwaukee 
 St. John de Nepomuc Elementary School, MilwaukeeSt. John de Nepomuc Elementary School was established in 1927 and served the children of parishioners of the Bohemian and German-speaking St. John de Nepomuc Parish. It opened with four classrooms and was staffed by School Sisters of Notre Dame. This soon became too crowded, and in 1955, a new school building opened to hold the burgeoning number of pupils. By the 1980s, the St. John's was thriving, but the parish was struggling to pay its bills and was being subsidized by the school. In 1985 the Archdiocese demoted St. John's parish to a chapel, and closed the school for good.
 St. Joseph School, Cudahy 
 St. Joseph School, Fond du Lac 
 St. Lawrence School, Milwaukee 
 St. Malachy School, Horicon 
 St. Mary School, Fond du Lac 
 St. Mary School, Sheboygan Falls
 St. Mary School, South Milwaukee 
 St. Mary Czestochowa School, Milwaukee 
 Mary, Queen of Martyrs School, Milwaukee 
 St. Matthew School, Milwaukee
 St. Matthias School, Nenno 
 St. Michael School, Milwaukee
 Mother of Perpetual Help School, Milwaukee 
 Mother of Sorrows School, Little Kohler 
 St. Nicholas School, Milwaukee
 Our Lady of Sorrows School, Milwaukee
 St. Patrick School, Fond du Lac 
 St. Peter School, St. Peter 
 St. Philip Neri School, Milwaukee 
 St. Rita School, Milwaukee 
 St. Rose of Lima School, Fredonia 
 St. Rose School, Racine 
 Sacred Heart School, Allenton 
 St. Stanislaus School, Racine
 St. Stephen Martyr School, Milwaukee 
 St. Sylvester School, South Milwaukee
 St. Thomas Aquinas School, Milwaukee

References 

Milwaukee, former
Schools in Wisconsin
Roman Catholic Archdiocese of Milwaukee